Varicosavirus is a genus of plant viruses. The virus is associated with swelling in plant vein tissues. They are negative single stranded RNA viruses. The genus contains three species.

Taxonomy
The genus contains the following species:
Alopecurus varicosavirus
Lettuce big-vein associated varicosavirus
Trifolium varicosavirus

Structure
Virions consist of a non-enveloped rod-shaped capsid, having a helical symmetry of 120–360 nm in length, and a width of 18–30 nm.

Genome
The genome consists of a bi-segmented linear, single-stranded negative sense RNA. The first segment is about 6350–7000 nucleotides in length; the second, about 5630–6500 nucleotides in length.

References

External links

 Viralzone: Varicosavirus

Varicosaviruses
Virus genera